The Kouvola railway station is located in the city of Kouvola in Finland.

The Kouvola railway station is an important crossing point station. There is also a bus terminal by the station and together they form a travel centre.

Kouvola is one of the busiest crossing points in Finnish railways. There is traffic to four directions: to Helsinki via Lahti, to Kotka, to Pieksämäki and Kuopio via Mikkeli, and to Luumäki, after which the track forks to two directions: to Joensuu via Lappeenranta, or to Russia via the Vainikkala border control station. The Kouvola railway station serves local trains, express trains, InterCity and InterCity² trains, and Pendolino trains.

The service to Vyborg and St. Petersburg was accelerated in 2010, with new Allegro trains operated by Karelian Trains. The travel time on high speed train between Kouvola and St. Petersburg is approximately 2 hours 15 minutes.

Proposals exist to connect Kouvola to Helsinki via a new 106 km line, Itärata, through Porvoo and Helsinki Airport.

Gallery

References

External links 

Railway stations in Kymenlaakso
Railway stations opened in 1875
Kouvola